Paromoeocerus is a genus of beetles in the family Cerambycidae, containing the following species:

 Paromoeocerus barbicornis (Fabricius, 1792)
 Paromoeocerus notabilis Melzer, 1918
 Paromoeocerus scabricollis Melzer, 1927
 Paromoeocerus stictonotus Napp, 1976
 Paromoeocerus vestitus Gounelle, 1910

References

Unxiini